The 1899 U.S. Open was the fifth U.S. Open, held September 14–15 at Baltimore Country Club in Baltimore, Maryland. Willie Smith won his only major title, a record eleven strokes ahead of three runners-up.

On Thursday, Smith and future four-time champion Willie Anderson co-led with 77 in the morning and Anderson took the lead in the afternoon at 158, with Smith a stroke back. In the third round on Friday morning, Anderson's 85 allowed Smith to take a four-stroke lead over Alex Campbell, and his 77 in the afternoon distanced him from the field; Campbell ballooned to 94 and fell to twelfth.

Playing out of Midlothian Country Club in Chicago, Smith was the only player to record three sub-80 rounds, and did not score higher than a seven on any hole in the championship. Val Fitzjohn, George Low, and Bert Way tied for second, eleven strokes  Smith's margin of victory was the largest in the U.S. Open for 101 years, until Tiger Woods won by fifteen shots in 2000. Smith's brother Alex, a future two-time champion, finished seventh.

Smith won a gold medal and was given custody of the Championship Cup for a year.

Past champions in the field 

Source:

Did not play: Joe Lloyd (1897)

Round summaries

First round
Thursday, September 14, 1899 (morning)

Source:

Second round
Thursday, September 14, 1899 (afternoon)

Source:

Third round
Friday, September 15, 1899 (morning)

Source:

Final round
Friday, September 15, 1899 (afternoon)

Source:

References

External links
USGA Championship Database

U.S. Open (golf)
Golf in Maryland
Sports competitions in Baltimore
U.S. Open (golf)
U.S. Open (golf)
U.S. Open (golf)
U.S. Open (golf)